"Waiting" is a song by Australian singer-songwriter Kian. It released in July 2018 and has peaked at number 15 on the ARIA Singles Chart.

At the ARIA Music Awards of 2019, the song was nominated for Song of the Year.

At the APRA Music Awards of 2020, "Waiting" won the Most Performed Australian Work of the Year and Most Performed Alternative Work of the Year.

Background and release
Kian stepped into the spotlight singing on the chorus of Baker Boy's debut single "Cloud 9" in May 2017. Following the release of "Cloud 9", Kian released "Too Far Gone" in February 2018. In July 2018, Kian released "Waiting" a song he wrote in 2016, at the age of 14. 
Kian said "It's about that feeling of uncertainty when you don't know if they like you back – I know it's childish but I reckon everyone has found themselves in this insecure hole at some point in their lives no matter what age. Hidden within the lyrics are some things that relate to me personally along with metaphorical things to move the story along." In August 2018, the song was announced as the winner of the Triple J Unearthed competition. In November 2018, Kian signed a new recording deal with EMI Music Australia and Universal's Republic Records for the rest of the world. The single was re-released on 30 November 2018.

Music video
The music video for "Waiting" was released on 19 July 2018.

Charts

Weekly charts

Year-end charts

Certifications

Release history

References

2018 singles
2018 songs
Kian (musician) songs
APRA Award winners
Songs written by Kian (musician)